Organized in 1928 as the National Association of Exposition Managers to represent the interests of trade show and exposition managers, the International Association of Exhibitions and Events (IAEE) is today the leading association for the global exhibition industry. Today, IAEE represents over 8,500 individuals who conduct and support exhibitions around the world.

The IAEE has over 7,000 members in twelve chapters, which include:
 Central Texas Chapter
 Dallas/Fort Worth Chapter
 Mexico Chapter    
 Midwestern Chapter 
 New England Chapter
 New York Area Chapter
 Northern California Chapter
 Rocky Mountain Chapter
 Southeastern Chapter
 Southwest Chapter
 UNLV Student Chapter
 Washington D.C. Chapter

References
 Sandra L. Morrow, Ph.D., CEM, CAE and Robert Dallmeyer (2003). The Exhibition Industry: The Power of Commerce. Altona, Manitoba, Canada & Neche, North Dakota, USA. . 
 Penny Kent, CEM (2006). Art of the Show: Third Edition.

External links
 

Exhibitions